László Szabó (2 January 1908 – 6 December 1992) was a Hungarian rower. He competed at the 1936 Summer Olympics in Berlin with the men's eight where they came fifth.

References

1908 births
1992 deaths
Hungarian male rowers
Olympic rowers of Hungary
Rowers at the 1936 Summer Olympics
Sportspeople from Komárom-Esztergom County
European Rowing Championships medalists